Rainbow Mountain is a broad glaciated summit forming the northeastern wall of the Callaghan Valley in the Pacific Ranges of British Columbia, Canada.

Climate 
Based on the Köppen climate classification, Rainbow Mountain is located in the marine west coast climate zone of western North America. Most weather fronts originate in the Pacific Ocean, and travel east toward the Coast Mountains where they are forced upward by the range (Orographic lift), causing them to drop their moisture in the form of rain or snowfall. As a result, the Coast Mountains experience high precipitation, especially during the winter months in the form of snowfall. Temperatures in winter can drop below −20 °C with wind chill factors below −30 °C.

See also 
 Geography of British Columbia

References

Two-thousanders of British Columbia
Sea-to-Sky Corridor
Garibaldi Ranges
New Westminster Land District